is a Prefectural Natural Park in western Nagano Prefecture, Japan.  Established in 1952, the park's central feature is Mount Ontake. The park spans the borders of the municipalities of Kiso and Ōtaki.

See also
 National Parks of Japan

References

External links
  Map of the parks of Nagano Prefecture

Parks and gardens in Nagano Prefecture
Parks and gardens in Gifu Prefecture
Protected areas established in 1952
1952 establishments in Japan
Kiso, Nagano (town)
Ōtaki, Nagano